Hugh Morrison (8 June 1868 – 15 March 1931) was a British Conservative Party politician.

The son of Alfred Morrison and Mabel née Chermside of Fonthill in Wiltshire, and grandson of millionaire businessman James Morrison, he was educated at Eton and Trinity College, Cambridge. In 1892 he married Lady Mary Leveson-Gower, daughter of Liberal statesman Granville Leveson-Gower, 2nd Earl Granville. The couple had two children, including John Morrison, who was elevated to the peerage as Baron Margadale in 1965. Hugh and his brother, Major James Morrison, became two of the wealthiest men in the United Kingdom, having inherited their grandfather's fortune. As well as Fonthill, he owned much of the Isle of Islay. In 1904 he served as Sheriff of Wiltshire, and was also appointed a Deputy Lieutenant of Argyllshire.

He was elected as Member of Parliament for Wilton at a by-election in November 1918, holding the seat for a few weeks until it was abolished for the 1918 general election. He was then elected as MP for Salisbury, holding that seat until his narrow defeat at the 1923 general election by the Liberal Party candidate Hugh Moulton. He regained the seat from Moulton in 1924, and was re-elected in 1929. In his final years in parliament he was in ill health, and he resigned from the House of Commons in 1931. He died soon afterwards at his London town house, aged 62.

References

External links 

1868 births
1931 deaths
Conservative Party (UK) MPs for English constituencies
UK MPs 1910–1918
UK MPs 1918–1922
UK MPs 1922–1923
UK MPs 1924–1929
UK MPs 1929–1931
People from Wiltshire
Deputy Lieutenants of Argyllshire
High Sheriffs of Wiltshire
People educated at Eton College
Alumni of Trinity College, Cambridge
British landowners
Hugh